Caitlin Wood (born 15 January 1997 in Maitland, New South Wales) is an Australian female racing driver who last competed in the 2021 W Series.

Biography
Hailing from Tenambit in the New South Wales Hunter Valley, Wood began her professional motorsport career in 2013 in a state-level Formula Ford championship. She ended her debut in car racing 5th out of 7 in the championship. She subsequently moved up to the inaugural Australian Formula Ford Championship in 2015, however she struggled to 21st in the championship with only three points finishes. The Australian Formula 4 Championship would become the new national feeder series in Australia, and Wood contested a three-event part-time schedule – eventually finishing 13th in the championship before setting her sights on Europe.

Wood was accepted into Reiter Engineering's Young Stars program in early 2016, and was entered into the GT4 European Series. She finished 17th in the championship despite missing the round at Silverstone. Reiter promoted Wood to their Blancpain Sprint Series program for 2017 alongside Finnish driver Marko Helistekangas, although the duo only contested the first round before being promoted again to the Blancpain Endurance Series where they were joined by Tomáš Enge. Due to budget constraints, the team only contested the 1000km of Paul Ricard and 3 Hours of Barcelona, and failed to score any points. Wood then switched to Lamborghini Super Trofeo Europe for 2018, joining British team MTech. She contested the opening two rounds at Monza and Silverstone, before missing the next two events after she broke her ankle in training. She returned for the fifth round at the Nürburgring, scoring a best result of sixth before running out of funding; she then remained in the United Kingdom for the rest of the year working as a driver coach.

Wood applied for the W Series evaluation in 2019, and qualified as one of the seasons' 18 permanent drivers. She scored a point with a 10th place in the season opener at the Hockenheim round, before suffering a run of misfortune in the following races; having gone off-track in a points-scoring position at Zolder, damaging her suspension in qualifying at Misano that put her at the back of the grid for the race, and a comeback drive from clutch issues at the Norisring saw her only finish 11th. Wood finished 5th place at the Assen round, scoring her best result for the series. Despite this, she missed the automatic invitation to the 2020 season by a single point after another 11th-place finish at Brands Hatch.

Racing record

Career summary

* Season still in progress.

Bathurst 12 Hours results

Complete W Series results
(key) (Races in bold indicate pole position) (Races in italics indicate fastest lap)

* Season still in progress.

References

External links

 Profile at Driver Database
 Website 

Australian female racing drivers
Racing drivers from New South Wales
People from Maitland, New South Wales
1997 births
Living people
W Series drivers
Australian F4 Championship drivers
24H Series drivers
GT4 European Series drivers